Harleen is a given name. Notable people with the name include:

Harleen Deol (born 1998), Indian cricketer

Fictional characters
Dr. Harleen Frances Quinzel or Harley Quinn, a fictional character in DC Comics

See also
Harley (disambiguation)